Nomo may refer to:

Places
Nomo Peninsula, Japan

People
Hideo Nomo (born 1968), Japanese baseball pitcher
Edouard Nomo-Ongolo, Cameroonian politician
Bernard N'Nomo (born 1980), Cameroonian rugby union player
Ulrich N'Nomo (born 1996), French footballer

Other
Nomo (band)
NOMO1, protein in humans
NoMo ("No-modern") as used in the postmodern culture jamming lexicon (See: Postinternet; Adbusters)

See also
Nomos (disambiguation)